Malen Chiefdom is a chiefdom in Pujehun District of Sierra Leone under supervision of Chief B.V.S. Kebby (Kebbie) with a population of 22,090. Its principal town is Sahn. The chiefdom is located west of the town of Pujehun.  The primary economic activity is subsistence farming. The largest employer is Socfin, a palm oil producer.  Malaria is endemic in the chiefdom with an estimated infection rate of 40% (∓5%).

References

Chiefdoms of Sierra Leone
Southern Province, Sierra Leone